L. maximus  may refer to:
 Lagostomus maximus, the plains viscacha or plains vizcacha, a rodent species found in Argentina, Bolivia, and Paraguay
 Latirus maximus, a sea snail species
 Limax maximus, the great grey slug or leopard slug, one of the largest kinds of keeled air-breathing land slug in the world native to Europe
 Longidorus maximus, a plant pathogenic nematode species

See also
 Maximus (disambiguation)